Lamberth is a surname. Notable people with the surname include:

Royce Lamberth (born 1943), American judge
William Lamberth (born 1977), American politician

See also
Lambert (name)

English-language surnames